Breakin' It Up On the Beatles Tour is an LP album by Jackie DeShannon, released by Liberty Records under catalog number LRP-3390 as a monophonic recording in 1964, and later in stereo under catalog number LST-7390 the same year. Contrary to what the title says, this LP was not recorded during a Beatles tour. DeShannon was an opening act on their 1964 North American tour, but the LP is collection of a dozen tracks that had already been released on Liberty singles between 1962 and 1964.

In 2005 RPM Records rereleased the album with eight bonus tracks.

Track listing

References

1964 compilation albums
Jackie DeShannon albums
Albums arranged by Jack Nitzsche
Albums produced by Dick Glasser
Liberty Records compilation albums